There are a number of elementary schools named Carver Elementary School:

 Carver Elementary School (San Marino, California)
 Carver Elementary School (Santa Ana, California)
 Carver Elementary School (Royal Oak Charter Township, Michigan), listed as a Michigan State Historic Site
 Carver Elementary School (Newport News, Virginia) 
Carver Elementary School (Carver, Massachusetts)